Nikolay Nikolaev or Nikolay Nikolayev  may refer to:

 Nikolay Nikolaev (politician) (born 1970), Russian politician
 Nikolay Nikolaev (footballer, born 1992), Bulgarian footballer
 Nikolay Nikolaev (footballer, born 1997), Bulgarian footballer